Polycera aurisula is a species of sea slug, a nudibranch, a marine gastropod mollusk in the family Polyceridae.

Distribution
This species of polycerid nudibranch was described from Brazil. It is found on the American coast as far north as Florida.

Description
The body of Polycera aurisula is translucent white with small brown spots densely covering the back and sides. The oral veil has 4-6 tapering papillae which are white with a yellow band near the base, a dark blue band at the midpoint and a light blue tip.

Ecology
Polycera aurisula feeds on the bryozoan Amathia distans Busk, 1886.

References 

Polyceridae
Gastropods described in 1957